The Division of Macquarie is an Australian electoral division in the state of New South Wales. The division was created in 1900 and was one of the original 65 divisions contested at the first federal election. It is named for Lachlan Macquarie, who was Governor of New South Wales between 1810 and 1821.

The division is located to the west of Sydney, and today it covers a large part of the Blue Mountains, as well as the Hawkesbury region on Sydney's western fringe.

The current Member for Macquarie, since the 2016 federal election, is Susan Templeman, a member of the Australian Labor Party. 

In 2019, Macquarie was the most marginal seat in the country, held by a 0.19% margin on the 2PP. However, in 2022 the Labor margin expanded to a comfortable 7.6%.

Geography
Since 1984, federal electoral division boundaries in Australia have been determined at redistributions by a redistribution committee appointed by the Australian Electoral Commission. Redistributions occur for the boundaries of divisions in a particular state, and they occur every seven years, or sooner if a state's representation entitlement changes or when divisions of a state are malapportioned.

History

The most prominent former member is Ben Chifley, who was Prime Minister of Australia from 1945 to 1949, and was a member of the Australian Labor Party.

Voting patterns within the electorate vary significantly between the Blue Mountains and the Hawkesbury region. At the 2004 election, the two-party preferred vote favoured the Liberal candidate by more than 70:30 in the Hawkesbury region. The result was partially reversed in the Blue Mountains where the result was approximately 60:40, favouring the Labor candidate. This voting pattern was evident in the three previous federal elections up to 2007.

For most of the first seven decades after Federation, it was a hybrid urban-rural seat that stretched from the outer western suburbs of Sydney to the Central Tablelands, including Penrith and St Marys in Sydney and Bathurst, Lithgow, Portland and Oberon in the Central Tablelands. However, in 1977, the Central Tablelands were replaced by the Hawkesbury towns, and a 1984 redistribution carved the new seat of Lindsay out of much of its share of Sydney.

The division has changed hands many times during its long history, but in elections previous to 2007 Kerry Bartlett consolidated his 1996 win to make the electorate a fairly safe Liberal seat.

On 13 September 2006, however the Australian Electoral Commission announced that the seat was to be redistributed. The Hawkesbury towns moved to Greenway while Macquarie was pushed some distance into the Central Tablelands, as far west as Bathurst. The seat then contained the rural service and university town of Bathurst and the working-class towns of Lithgow, Portland and Oberon with the Blue Mountains. This not only restored the seat's connection with Chifley (a Bathurst native), but erased Bartlett's majority.  While Bartlett had previously sat on a majority of eight percent, he now found himself in a seat with a notionally marginal Labor majority of 0.5 percent.  Bartlett was defeated by former New South Wales Minister for the Environment and Attorney General Bob Debus, whose state seat of Blue Mountains covered much of the eastern portion of the seat, at the 2007 election on a 7.04 percent margin, turning it into a fairly safe Labor seat in one stroke.

During the 2009 redistribution, however, Bathurst and Lithgow were shifted to Calare, restoring its pre-2007 boundaries. The redistribution nearly wiped out Labor's majority in the electorate, reducing it to an extremely marginal 0.3 percent. Debus retired before the 2010 election. Louise Markus, previously the Member for Greenway, reclaimed the seat for the Liberals in this election. She was ousted in the 2016 election by Labor's Susan Templeman.

Members

Election results

References

External links
Division of Macquarie - Australian Electoral Commission

Electoral divisions of Australia
Constituencies established in 1901
1901 establishments in Australia